Ventoux may refer to:

Mont Ventoux
Renault Ventoux engine
Ventoux AOC, a French wine appellation formerly known as Côtes du Ventoux